Dùn Tealtaig is a promontory fort located on the Inner Hebridean island of Colonsay, Scotland.

The fort is located north east of Duntealtaig and overlooks Port an Tighe Mhòir and Kiloran Bay.

Citations

Archaeological sites in the Southern Inner Hebrides
Promontory forts in Scotland
Colonsay
Former populated places in Scotland